Unto These Hills could be:
Unto These Hills, a play first performed in 1940
"Unto These Hills", a song on The Marshall Tucker Band's album Running Like the Wind